Patrick Stacey Murnane Flottmann (born 19 April 1997) is an Australian professional footballer player who plays as a defender last time for Indian Super League club NorthEast United.

Personal
Flottmann attended Turramurra High School and played on their soccer team as the vice-captain.

Club career

Sydney FC

Air Force United
In January 2018, Flottmann left Sydney FC due to lack of game time and signed with Thai League 2 club Air Force United. He played 17 matches during his season at Air Force United.

Return to Sydney FC
Flottmann returned to his youth club, Sydney FC in July 2019, signing a 2-year senior contract. He made his debut on 29 December 2019 against Melbourne City, coming on as a substitute to replace Adam Le Fondre in the 88th minute. On 28 April 2021, he was loaned to Brisbane Roar for a couple of weeks to provide injury cover for Tom Aldred. In July 2021, Sydney FC announced that they had released Flottmann.

NorthEast United
In November 2021, Flottmann signed with Indian Super League club NorthEast United. He made his debut against Kerala Blasters FC on 25 November. He scored his first goal on 17 December in a 2–0 win against East Bengal.

International career
In September 2015, Flottmann was called up to the Australian under-20 squad for the 2016 AFC U-19 Championship qualification, but he did not make an appearance in Australia's 3 matches. A year later, he was selected for the Australian under-20 squad for the 2016 AFF U-19 Youth Championship in Vietnam. He made 3 appearances in the group stage, playing in the 2–0 victory over Cambodia, the 3–1 victory over Indonesia, and the 1–5 loss to Thailand.

Honours

International 
Australia U20
 AFF U-19 Youth Championship: 2016

References

External links

Patrick Flottmann at Indian Super League

1997 births
Living people
Australian soccer players
Australian people of German descent
Association football defenders
Sydney FC players
Brisbane Roar FC players
NorthEast United FC players
National Premier Leagues players
A-League Men players